Tommie Harris, Jr. (born April 29, 1983) is an American former professional football player who was a defensive tackle for eight seasons in the National Football League (NFL).  He played college football for the University of Oklahoma, and was recognized as a consensus All-American twice. The Chicago Bears chose him in the first round of the 2004 NFL Draft, and he also played a season for the San Diego Chargers.  He was a three-time Pro Bowl selection.

Early years
Harris was born in Germany and raised in Killeen, Texas. He attended Ellison High School in Killeen.  As a member of the Ellison Eagles, Harris became one of the nation's top defensive high school prospects, including being ranked as the No. 35 high school prospect in the nation by recruiting analyst Tom Lemming.  During the 1998 football season, he was a back-up defensive tackle in his sophomore year for the Eagles who were ranked No. 1 in the state of Texas and No. 13 in the nation.  He was also a member of Ellison's track and field team, where he participated in the shot put.

College career
While attending the University of Oklahoma, Harris played for coach Bob Stoops's Oklahoma Sooners football team from 2001 to 2003.  He is one of the very few players in OU history to start every game of his true freshman season.  He was a two-time All-Big 12 selection, and was recognized as a consensus first-team All-American in 2002 and a unanimous first-team All-American in 2003.  In his junior and final season as a Sooner, Harris won the Lombardi Award as the nation's best lineman in 2003.  He was named to the Sports Illustrated All-Decade Team in 2009.

Professional career

2004 NFL Combine

Chicago Bears
In 2004, he finished second in balloting for the Defensive Rookie of the Year award. In only his second NFL season, Harris was selected for the 2006 Pro Bowl for the first time. Harris was well suited for coach Lovie Smith's version of the Tampa 2 defense, which relies on quick, mobile linemen to get pressure on the quarterback.

Harris enjoyed an excellent start to the  season, leading the league with five sacks after four games. He was instrumental in a Week 3 victory over the Vikings, disrupting a handoff in the Vikings backfield and forcing a fumble, which allowed the Bears to score the game-winning touchdown. Furthermore, Harris was awarded the NFC's "Player of the Week" award twice in three weeks. However, in the following weeks, Harris' productivity declined. Additionally, Harris was forced to leave the Bears' Week 13 match-up against the Vikings after sustaining a knee injury. Further medical review determined that Harris had severely injured his hamstring, and he missed the remainder of the 2006 season.

Despite the injury, Harris was selected to play in the 2007 Pro Bowl, and appeared on the cover of the February issue of Sports Illustrated for Kids. Without Harris, the Bears noticed a significant decline in their pass rush and run defense. Though the Bears beat the New Orleans Saints to win the NFC Championship, the Indianapolis Colts beat the Bears in Super Bowl XLI.

Harris saw limited action throughout the subsequent preseason, and only made a brief return during the final game of the preseason against the Cleveland Browns. He played in the Bears' season opener against the San Diego Chargers and forced a fumble. He finished 2007 with eight sacks and two forced fumbles.

On June 19, 2008, Harris signed a contract extension with the Chicago Bears for $40 million over four years. It also included a $8.5 million Pro Bowl bonus, which he would receive if he made it to the Pro Bowl in 2008, 2009, and 2010. He could've made an additional $2 million based on performance. It also included $17 million in guarantees and made Harris the highest paid defensive tackle in the NFL. That salary has since been surpassed by Ndamukong Suh.

Harris' role with the Bears decreased since he injured his knee during a Week 3 game of the 2007 season. The injury hampered his performance throughout portions of the 2008 season, and into the 2010 season. Nevertheless, Harris recorded eight sacks in 2007 despite starting in 13 games that season. On November 8, 2009, Harris was ejected just 65 seconds into the first quarter in a game against the Arizona Cardinals for punching guard Deuce Lutui in the face. He later apologized for the incident.

In 2010, Harris was benched after the second week of the season. Head coach Lovie Smith stated, "We have 45 guys that you can go with; we have everybody healthy right now. Just felt like we wanted to get a look at Marcus Harrison, him and Henry Melton inside, a little bit. Just performance based. Tommie's been doing everything we've asked him to do." The same week, former defensive tackle Warren Sapp criticized Harris, comparing him to "blind dog in a meat house." Harris returned to the Bears the next week, but lost his starting position. He recorded his only sack of the season in week 17 against the Green Bay Packers.

On February 28, 2011, Harris, along with linebacker Hunter Hillenmeyer and offensive tackle Kevin Shaffer, was released by the Bears. During his seven seasons with the Bears, Harris played in 104 games, recording 213 tackles and 28.5 sacks.

Indianapolis Colts
On August 2, 2011, Harris signed a one-year contract with the Indianapolis Colts, but was released on September 3.

San Diego Chargers

Harris signed with the San Diego Chargers on September 28, 2011. That was his final season in the NFL.

Retirement

Harris decided to retire after his wife died in 2012.

NFL career statistics

Post-retirement
Harris was the co-owner of the Texas Outlaws of the Fall Experimental Football League along with fellow NFL alum Eric Bassey. Harris also has a fitness center named in his honor, in Killeen, Texas.

Personal
In 2012, Harris' wife Ashley died of a brain aneurysm after 30 days of marriage.

References

External links
 
 San Diego Chargers bio

1983 births
Living people
African-American players of American football
All-American college football players
American football defensive tackles
Chicago Bears players
Indianapolis Colts players
National Conference Pro Bowl players
Oklahoma Sooners football players
Sportspeople from Killeen, Texas
Players of American football from Texas
San Diego Chargers players
21st-century African-American sportspeople
20th-century African-American people
Ed Block Courage Award recipients
Brian Piccolo Award winners